Multyfarnham is a townland in County Westmeath, Ireland.

Multyfarnham is one of 14 townlands of the civil parish of Multyfarnham in the barony of Corkaree in the Province of Leinster. 

The neighbouring townlands are: Donore and Froghanstown to the north, Lismalady to the north and east, Multyfarnham or Fearbranagh and Ballindurrow to the south and Rathganny, Abbeyland and Ballynaclonagh to the west.

In the 1911 census of Ireland there were 17 houses and 65 inhabitants in the townland.

References

External links
Map of Multyfarnham at openstreetmap.org
Multyfarnham at the IreAtlas Townland Data Base
Multyfarnham at Townlands.ie
Multyfarnham at The Placenames Database of Ireland

Townlands of County Westmeath